The 2022–23 season is Partick Thistle's second season back in the Scottish Championship, having been promoted from League One at the end of the 2020–21 season.

Summary

Results and fixtures

Pre-season

Scottish Championship

Scottish League Cup

Group stage

Knockout phase

Scottish Challenge Cup

Scottish Cup

Glasgow Cup

Group stage
Results

Squad statistics

Player statistics

|-
|colspan="12"|Players who left the club during the 2022–23 season
|-

|}

Club statistics

League table

League Cup table

Glasgow Cup table

Transfers

In

Out

Loans In

Loans Out

See also
 List of Partick Thistle F.C. seasons

References

Partick Thistle F.C. seasons
Partick Thistle